The fifth season of The Contender was recorded in Los Angeles, California and premiered on Epix on August 24, 2018. The series was on its fourth network, with the first season being broadcast on NBC, the second and third seasons on ESPN, and the fourth season on Versus.

Contestants
The following 16 fighters, hailing from around the globe, were selected to take part in the fifth Contender Tournament which took place in the Middleweight division.

Crew

Fight results

|}

on the undercard of the final, the following contenders were brought back to face each other:
Tyrone Brunson def Devaun Lee via UD (59-55 x 3) 
Ievgen Khytrov def Malcolm McAllister via KO4
Gerald Sherrell def Morgan Fitch via SD (58-56, 58-56, 56-58)
Marcos Hernandez def Quatavious Cash via UD (58-56 x 3)

References

2018 American television seasons
5